Geoffrey James Blackburn (born 13 November 1950) is a former English cricketer.  Blackburn was a left-handed batsman who bowled slow left-arm orthodox.  He was born in Liverpool, Lancashire.

Blackburn made his debut for Cheshire in the 1987 Minor Counties Championship against Oxfordshire.  Blackburn played Minor counties cricket for Cheshire from 1987 to 1990, including 29 Minor Counties Championship matches and 9 MCCA Knockout Trophy matches.  In 1987, he made his List A debut against Glamorgan in the NatWest Trophy.  He played two further List A matches for Cheshire, against Northamptonshire, which Cheshire famously won by 1 wicket, and Derbyshire, both in the 1988 NatWest Trophy.  In his three List A matches, he scored 23 runs at a batting average of 7.66, with a high score of 19.  With the ball he took 5 wickets at a bowling average of 21.40, with best figures of 2/21.

He also played Second XI cricket for the Lancashire Second XI in 1981.

References

External links
Geoffrey Blackburn at ESPNcricinfo
Geoffrey Blackburn at CricketArchive

1950 births
Living people
Cricketers from Liverpool
English cricketers
Cheshire cricketers